Visions of Ibiza is a 2-CD set compiled by Chicane, released in 2001 under Beechwood Music Ltd.

Track listing
Disc one
 Kamasutra – "Sugar Steps"
 Heights of Abraham – "E.V.A."
 Aphex Twin – "Windowlicker"
 The Sabres of Paradise – "Smokebelch II" (Beatless Mix)
 Everything but the Girl – "Before Today" (Chicane Mix)
 Chicane – "Offshore" (Disco Citizens radio edit)
 Simple Minds – "A Brass Band in African Chimes"
 Innocence – "Natural Thing"
 Rabbit in the Moon – "Deeper"
 Jean Michel Jarre – "Oxygene Part 2"
 Chicane – "Early"
 The Orb – "Into the Fourth Dimension"

Disc two
 Leftfield – "Not Forgotten"
 Slam – "Eterna"
 Spice – "69 Overdrive" (Timo Maas Remix)
 Mansun – "Wide Open Space" (Perfecto Mix)
 Tin Tin Out – "Strings for Yasmin"
 Planet Funk – "Chase the Sun" (Adam Freeland Mix)
 Huff and Puff – "Help Me Make It"
 South Street Players – "(Who?) Keeps Changing Your Mind" (Fresh Fruit Mix)
 Bassheads – "Is There Anybody Out There?" (Desa Basshead)
 Three Drives – "Greece 2000"
 Dubstar – "Stars" (Way Out West Mix)
 Rank 1 – "Airwave" (radio edit)

References

2001 compilation albums
Chicane (musician) albums